"Clear" (stylized as "CLEAR") is a song recorded by Japanese singer Maaya Sakamoto. It was released as a single on January 31, 2018, through FlyingDog. It was written by Sakamoto and composed by Yoshiki Mizuno of the band Ikimono-gakari. "Clear" is the opening theme to the NHK anime Cardcaptor Sakura: Clear Card, the sequel to Cardcaptor Sakura, for which Sakamoto's "Platinum" served as opening theme for the third season close to twenty years prior. An acoustic take of "Platinum" performed on June 4, 2017 at the Itsukushima Shrine in Hiroshima is included as a coupling track on the single.

Chart performance
The single entered the daily Oricon Singles Chart at number 9 on January 30, 2018. It debuted at number 13 on the weekly Oricon Singles Chart, with 9,000 copies sold. "Clear" also charted on several Billboard Japan charts: at number 8 on the Hot 100, at number 2 on Hot Animation, number 4 on Download Songs and at number 12 on Top Singles Sales. The single also charted on the Oricon Digital Singles Chart, ranking at number 4 and selling a reported 18,000 downloads on its first week.

Track listing

Credits and personnel
Personnel

 Vocals, backing vocals, production – Maaya Sakamoto
 Songwriting – Maaya Sakamoto, Yoshiki Mizuno
 Arrangement, piano, programming, electronic keyboard – Shin Kōno
 Drums – Yasuo Sano
 Bass – Takeshi Taneda
 Guitar – Tsuneo Imahori
 Strings – Chieko Kinbara Strings
 Mixing – Toshihiko Miyoshi
 Engineering – Hiroaki Yamazaki
 Mastering – Hiroshi Kawasaki

Charts

Sales

References

2018 songs
2018 singles
Anime songs
Cardcaptor Sakura
Songs written by Maaya Sakamoto
Maaya Sakamoto songs
FlyingDog singles